The Place du Palais tram stop is located on line  of the tramway de Bordeaux.

Situation 
The station is located on Cours d'Alsace et Lorraine in Bordeaux.

Junctions 
There are no junctions with other tram lines or buses at this station.

See also 
 TBC
 Tramway de Bordeaux

Bordeaux tramway stops
Tram stops in Bordeaux
Railway stations in France opened in 2003